Laung Sauk or Lawngsawk is a village and village tract in Hkamti Township in Hkamti District in the Sagaing Region of northwestern Burma. As of 2014 the village tract had a population of 443 people.

Geography
Laung Sauk is located in the hill forest to the northwest of Hkamti town. A dirt trail leads up to the isolated Laung Sauk area from Hkamti and the Chindwin River. To the north of Laung Sauk is the river village of Mandung.

Demographics
At the time of the 2014 census the village tract had a population of 443 people of which 226 were men and 217 were women. 66 households were recorded. The locals speak their own dialect, "lawng-sauk".

References

External links
Maplandia World Gazetteer

Populated places in Hkamti District
Village tracts of Hkamti Township